The 1718 Tongwei–Gansu earthquake occurred on June 19, 1718, in Tongwei County, Gansu Province, Qing dynasty, present-day China. The estimated surface wave magnitude 7.5 earthquake was assigned a maximum Modified Mercalli intensity of X (Extreme), causing tremendous damage and killing 73,000 people.

Tectonic setting

The active plate tectonics of Gansu Province located on the Tibetan Plateau is dominated by the north–south continental collision of the Indian Plate and Eurasian Plate. As the Indian Plate collides along a convergent plate boundary known as the Main Himalayan Thrust, it being of continental crust does not subduct, rather, it plows into the Eurasian Plate. This process severely deforms the Eurasian Plate, uplifting the crust, forming the Tibetan Plateau. The force of the Indian Plate converging pushes the Tibetan Plateau east, towards the Sichuan Basin, forming another zone of collision. This collision and resulting crustal deformation of the Eurasian Plate is accommodated by the Xianshuihe fault system, Haiyuan Fault, Kunlun Fault, Altyn Tagh fault, and Longmenshan Fault. The presence of active faults in Gansu makes the region vulnerable to damaging earthquakes. The very deadly 2008 Sichuan earthquake occurred due to a thrust fault rupture on the Longmenshan Fault. The 1920 Haiyuan and 1927 Gulang earthquakes occurred due to ruptures along the Haiyuan Fault.

Earthquake
The West Qinling Fault in the Tibetan plateau, an active left–lateral strike-slip fault was proposed as the source of the earthquake although there is no seismological evidence to prove this. In the past 300 years since the event, the fault has not produced any major earthquakes. Another proposed source is the adjacent Tongwei thrust fault, although little is known about its associated seismic activity. No surface ruptures from the earthquake has been documented, suggesting it may be a buried rupture earthquake.

Effects
All structures including government offices, schools, temples, and homes in Nanxiang were destroyed. It was reported that the only surviving structure was a portion of the brick city wall at the northeast corner of the city. Over 40,000 people were killed in the city. Another 30,000 people died in Yongning when massive landslides buried many homes in the area. Ground effects were severe; large fissures appeared, and the landscape was deformed. A large landslide completely buried Yongning Ancient Town during the quake.

Several mountain peaks including one at Jingning County detached and fell, damming a river, and killing several thousand. In Zhuanglang County, a large hill suffered a landslide, resulting in thousands of deaths. Many gate towers, pavilions, and battlements in Qin'an County were destroyed.

In Tianshui, the earthquake collapsed Confucian Temples and homes. Ground fissures and landslides killed some residents. Smaller fatality figures were reported in other parts of Gansu Province. The earthquake also affected Shaanxi and Henan provinces.

Landslides
The earthquake gained notable scientific attention due to the triggerering of over 300 large landslides. Most of the slides consisted of several meters of loess and mudstone deposits along steep mountainsides near the Wei River. Three of the largest landslides in Pan'an, Tianshui, Gangu County, had a combined volume of 6.06 × 108 m3. Locating the distribution of landslides using Google Earth found a dense concentration of occurrence along the Tongwei Fault.

See also
 List of earthquakes in China
 List of historical earthquakes

References

1718 disasters
Earthquakes in Gansu
Earthquakes in China
1718 in China
1718 in Asia
Tongwei County
Buried rupture earthquakes
1718 in Tibet
Zhuanglang County
Jingning County, Gansu
Landslides in China
Disasters in Qing dynasty
18th-century disasters in China
1718 disasters in Asia